A chemosensitizer is a drug that makes tumor cells more sensitive to the effects of chemotherapy.

References
 Chemosensitizer entry in the public domain NCI Dictionary of Cancer Terms

Antineoplastic drugs